John Cotyngham (fl. 1399–1425), of Wycombe, Buckinghamshire, was an English politician.

Cotyngham was married, his wife's name is unrecorded. They had one son, MP, Robert Cotyngham.

He was a Member (MP) of the Parliament of England for Wycombe in 1399, 1406 and 1425.

References

14th-century births
1425 deaths
English MPs 1399
English MPs 1406
English MPs 1425
14th-century English politicians
15th-century English politicians
People from Buckinghamshire